Rowing at the Summer Paralympics has been part of the competition since the 2008 Summer Paralympics. Rowing as a sport has been part of the Summer Olympics since 1896 Summer Olympics. Rowing at the paralympics is under the jurisdiction of the International Rowing Federation (or FISA, its French acronym) the same as the Olympics.

Disciplines and events

Race distances
All races are raced over a 1000 m straight course, whereas the Olympic distance is 2000 m.

Qualification
There is a limited number of crews permitted to race, so the International Rowing Federation holds qualification events in order to determine who competes at the Paralympic Games.  At the Paralympic Games, each National Olympic Committee can only have one boat per event.

Medal table
Updated after the 2020 Summer Paralympics

Nations
List of all athletes that participated in all events (both men's and women's).

See also
 Rowing at the Summer Olympics
 List of rowing venues - includes Olympic venues and non Olympic venues

References

External links
Olympic Rowing Medalists at HickokSports.com

 
Summer Paralympics
Rowing